John Ursua (born January 17, 1994), nicknamed J-Dub, is an American football wide receiver who is a free agent. He played college football at Hawaii.

Early life
Ursua was born in Kailua-Kona, Hawaii on January 17, 1994, and is the youngest of five children to Larry and Laurie Ursua. Ursua was a multi-sport athlete in high school earning a total of 12 varsity letters in football, baseball, and track and field. He attended Kealakehe High School in Kailua-Kona, Westlake High School in Saratoga Springs, Utah, and ultimately graduated from Cedar High School in Cedar City, Utah in 2012.

College career
Ursua was an accomplished quarterback during his high school football career. He was rated by Rivals.com as the Number 10 prospect and by 247Sports as the Number 18 prospect for the state of Utah. Initially, Ursua verbally committed to BYU during his sophomore year at Westlake High School. Norm Chow, who was Utah’s offensive coordinator at the time, discovered Ursua's talents as a wide receiver. After Chow was named Hawaii’s head coach in December 2011, he offered a scholarship to Ursua. In between high school graduation and the start of his collegiate football career, Ursua served on a two year mission for the Church of Jesus Christ of Latter-day Saints to Paris, France.

Freshman season
Ursua was redshirted for the 2015 season.

Freshman (redshirt) season
During his sophomore season of 2016, Ursua appeared in all 14 games (13 starts) as a slot receiver. He finished second on the team with 53 receptions for 652 yards, 3 touchdowns, and two 100-yard games. He also carried the ball four times for eight yards during the season and scored his first career rushing touchdown against Nevada. He was the team’s primary punt returner with eight returns for 63 yards. Despite finishing the regular season with a losing record of 6-7, Hawaii qualified for a bowl game and won the 2016 Hawaii Bowl against Middle Tennessee by a score of 52-35.

Sophomore (redshirt) season
Prior to the 2017 season, Ursua was named to the Polynesian College Football Player of the Year watch-list as well as to the Fred Biletnikoff Award watch-list for the nation’s top wide receiver. He played in six games before suffering a season-ending injury against San José State on 
October 16. He entered that game leading the nation in receiving yards per game with 130.6 and second in receptions per game with 9.2. Despite missing half of the season, Ursua finished as the team’s leader in receiving yards with 667 and receiving touchdowns with 5. He finished the season with 47 receptions, averaging 14.2 yards per catch, and produced three 100-yard receiving performances. On August 26 in an season-opening win against UMass, Ursua amassed 272 yards and one touchdown on 12 catches. The 272 yards was the best nationally in 2017 for a single game, the fourth-highest total ever by a UH player, the fourth-highest total ever by a Mountain West player, and his 85-yard touchdown catch during that game was the fifth-longest catch in school history.

Junior (redshirt) season
Ursua led the nation in receiving touchdowns with 16. His 17 total touchdowns (one rushing touchdown versus Army) ranked 10th in the NCAA. He ranked fifth nationally in receiving yards with 1,343 and eighth in receiving yards per game with 103.3. He led the Mountain West Conference in receiving touchdowns, receiving yards, receiving yards per game, and total touchdowns. He eclipsed 100-yards in seven games and scored multiple touchdowns in five games. He achieved a career-high 13 receptions in a game versus San Jose State. 
His senior year accomplishments included being named to the all-Mountain West first-team, selection to the Associated Press and USA Today Mid-Season All America second-team, a Semifinalist for the Biletnikoff Award, a finalist for the Polynesian Player of the Year, and named the team’s Most Valuable Player. During the 2018 season, he reached the feat of having at least one catch in 30 consecutive games dating back to his first season on the team. He missed the 2018 Hawaii Bowl due to an injury, in a game that Hawaii lost to Louisiana Tech 31-14. Ursua completed his college football career ranked in Hawaii's top ten for career receptions (189, 9th), receiving yards (2,662, 9th), and receiving touchdowns (24, 7th).

College career statistics

Professional career

Despite one more year of eligibility at Hawaii, Ursua declared for the 2019 NFL Draft on Christmas Day of 2018. He was drafted by the Seattle Seahawks in the seventh round with the 236th overall selection. Prior to the start of the draft, the Seahawks' last pick was in the 6th Round. However, during the draft they traded a 2020 sixth-rounder to the Jacksonville Jaguars for the seventh-round pick that was ultimately used to select Ursua. He is the 72nd player in Hawaii history to be selected in the NFL Draft and the third ever selected by the Seahawks joining Wayne Hunter in 2003 and M.L. Johnson in 1987. He was the second Rainbow Warrior selected in the 2019 Draft, joining Jahlani Tavai, a second round pick by the Detroit Lions. It is the first time Hawaii had multiple players drafted in the same year since the 2011 NFL Draft when Alex Green (Green Bay Packers), Greg Salas (St. Louis Rams), and Kealoha Pilares (Carolina Panthers) were selected.

In the 2019 season, Ursua appeared in three regular season games and recorded one reception for 11 receiving yards, which occurred in Week 17 against the San Francisco 49ers.

Ursua was placed on the reserve/COVID-19 list by the team on August 9, 2020, and activated from the list three days later. He was waived on September 8, 2020, and was re-signed to the practice squad the next day. He signed a reserve/future contract on January 13, 2021.

Ursua suffered a torn ACL in the second preseason game of 2021. He was placed on injured reserve on August 23, 2021.

Personal life
Ursua is an active member of the Church of Jesus Christ of Latter-day Saints and participated in mission trips to France, Belgium, and Luxembourg, and as a result speaks French. He also speaks Hawaiian.

Both of his older brothers were also college football players, having played for Southern Utah.

References

External links
Hawaii Rainbow Warriors bio
 Seattle Seahawks bio

1994 births
Living people
American football wide receivers
African-American players of American football
Native Hawaiian sportspeople
Hawaii Rainbow Warriors football players
People from Cedar City, Utah
People from Kailua-Kona, Hawaii
Players of American football from Hawaii
Players of American football from Utah
Seattle Seahawks players
American Mormon missionaries in France
American Mormon missionaries in Belgium
American Mormon missionaries in Luxembourg
Latter Day Saints from Hawaii
21st-century African-American sportspeople